The Brave were a Women's Professional Lacrosse League (WPLL) professional women's field lacrosse team.  They played in the WPLL beginning in the 2018 WPLL season.  In the 2018 season, the five teams in the WPLL played on a barnstorming format, with all five teams playing at a single venue.

Roster

References

Women's Professional Lacrosse League
Women's lacrosse teams in the United States
Lacrosse teams in Maryland
Sports teams in Baltimore
Lacrosse clubs established in 2018
2018 establishments in Maryland
Women's sports in Maryland